Security Screenings is an EP by Prefuse 73. It was released on Warp Records in 2006.

Although Security Screenings is actually as long as a proper LP, it is described as being an EP by the artist. It is not considered to be a follow-up to the 2005 album, Surrounded by Silence.

The original cover art displayed the artist's name as "Prefuse LXIII", which means "Prefuse 63". This was corrected in later printings.

Track listing

Charts

References

External links
 

2006 EPs
Prefuse 73 EPs
Warp (record label) EPs